is a 13-episode anime OVA series set in the Gundam universe. The first volume containing two 30-minute episodes was released in Japan on May 23, 1991. Subsequent volumes, containing one 30-minute episode each, followed every one or two months; the final volume went on sale on September 24, 1992. The series was directed by Mitsuko Kase (episodes 1–7) and Takashi Imanishi (episodes 8–13). A movie compilation, also directed by Imanishi was released in Japan on August 29, 1992, a month before the final OVA volume went on sale. The characters were designed by Toshihiro Kawamoto. Mechanical designs were by Shoji Kawamori (of Macross fame) and Hajime Katoki. 

Gundam 0083:Stardust Memory was licensed in North America by Bandai Entertainment and was available on VHS and DVD. The OVA series aired on Cartoon Network's Adult Swim in 2002.

Plot
The year is Universal Century 0083, and three years have passed after the One Year War ended with the Principality of Zeon's defeat. The Delaz Fleet, a group of Zeon remnants, launches an attack on the Earth Federation's Torrington Base, stealing the prototype Gundam GP02A "Physalis", a mobile suit with nuclear launch capability. Kou Uraki, a test pilot at Torrington Base, becomes the pilot for the Gundam GP01 "Zephyranthes", and joins the Pegasus-class carrier Albion as it pursues the stolen GP02A in order to stop the Delaz Fleet's ultimate goal: "Operation Stardust".

Characters

Main characters

Main mecha: RX-78GP01 Gundam GP01 "Zephyranthes"; RX-78GP01Fb Gundam GP01Fb "Zephyranthes" Full Burnern; RX-78GP03 Gundam GP03 "Dendrobium"
Other mecha: MS-06F-2 Zaku II F2
A 19-year-old Federation test pilot stationed at the Torrington base in Australia. When Anavel Gato steals the Gundam GP02A, Kou goes after him in the Gundam GP01. He is later assigned to the Albions mobile suit team under the command of Lieutenant South Burning with orders to either recapture or destroy the GP02A. Uraki matures during his stay aboard the Albion and develops a relationship with Anaheim Electronics systems engineer Nina Purpleton. Following Burning's death, Uraki is promoted from Ensign to Lieutenant Junior Grade by Captain Eiphar Synapse. In the aftermath of Operation Stardust, Uraki is court-martialed and sentenced to one year in hard labor, but his criminal record is erased when the Federation decides to sweep the Gundam Development Project under the rug. In U.C. 0084, after being demoted to Ensign, Uraki is relocated to Oakly Base in North America, where he reunites with Nina, as well as his former wingman Chuck Keith.

Main mecha: RX-78GP02A Gundam GP02A "Physalis"; AMX-002 Neue Ziel
Other mecha: MS-14A Gelgoog; YMS-09R-2 Prototype Rick Dom Zwei
A former member of the Principality of Zeon's elite palace guard unit. At the Battle of Solomon during the One Year War, Gato earned the nickname "Nightmare of Solomon". He joined Aiguille Delaz's fleet late in the war and departed with them following the fall of A Baoa Qu. Gato returns to Earth in October U.C. 0083 to seize the Gundam GP02A and later uses this mobile suit's nuclear weapon against the Federation's Naval Review in Episode 9. He dies in Episode 13 leading a kamikaze run against the Earth Federation fleet after inputting the Island East colony's final impact point, having fulfilled his mission.

A 21-year-old Anaheim Electronics systems engineer in charge of the project that developed the two Gundams, which she is extremely protective over. She reluctantly allows Uraki to pilot the Gundam GP01 in order to recapture the Gundam GP02A and they both slowly begin a romantic relationship. She is later revealed to have a romantic past with Anavel Gato.

Albion crew

The captain of the ship Albion, which is given the tall order of recapturing the stolen Gundam GP02A. During the events of Operation Stardust, Synapse goes against Federation orders and acquires the GP03 Dendrobium as a means to stop the Delaz Fleet from fulfilling their mission. In the aftermath of the operation, Synapse is charged with mutiny and sentenced to death.

Mecha: RGM-79C GM Type C; RGM-79N GM Custom
A 39-year-old senior pilot at the Federation's Torrington base, Lieutenant South Burning serves as mobile suit company commander for the Albion. He serves as a mentor for the rookies Kou Uraki and Chuck Keith. Burning dies in the eighth episode when his GM suddenly explodes after a brief encounter with Cima Garahau, but not before picking up a briefcase carrying details of what is known as "Operation Stardust."

Mecha: RGC-83 GM Cannon II; MS-06F-2 Zaku II F2; MS-14F Gelgoog Marine
Uraki's wingman at Torrington Base, he is likewise reassigned to the Albion as part of its mobile suit team. Over the course of the series, he has a romantic connection with Albion chief mechanic Mora Bascht. After the events of Operation Stardust, Keith is reassigned to Oakly Base in North America.

Mecha: RGM-79N GM Custom
One of three mobile suit pilots assigned to the Albion after the Delaz Fleet's assault on Torrington. Monsha takes an immediate dislike to Uraki and Keith, especially Kou for being chosen to pilot the Gundam GP01 despite a lack of experience. When he is not on duty, Monsha likes to drink, gamble, and chase women, and often sexually harasses Nina.

Mecha: RGM-79N GM Custom
Another reinforcement pilot who served under Lieutenant Burning alongside Monsha and Adel during the One Year War. Although he is calmer and less obnoxious than Monsha, Bate has a tendency to encourage his friend's misbehavior, but that does not prevent him from being promoted to deputy commander of the mobile suit team. He and Monsha, plus the rest of the Albions bridge crew are eventually drafted into the Titans.

Mecha: RGC-83 GM Cannon II
The third reinforcement pilot assigned to the Albion and the most mild-mannered of the three.

A tall, big-boned female mechanic who serves as chief of maintenance aboard the Albion and friend to Nina. She takes a liking to Chuck ever since she met him.

The Albions helmsman.

A bridge officer of the Albion.

A bridge officer of the Albion.

The Albions navigator.

A communications officer of the Albion.

Earth Federation

A Federation Admiral stationed at Jaburo base who is the Albions direct contact. Kowen is arrested under Jamitov Hyman's orders for insubordination during the final phase of Operation Stardust.

A Federation Major stationed at the La Vie en Rose space station. He kills Anaheim Electronics engineer Lucette Audevie while preventing Uraki from boarding the GP03 Dendrobium before he is ordered to drop his gun by Captain Synapse and his men.

Principality of Zeon

A strong supporter of Gihren Zabi's ideals, self-promoted Vice-Admiral Delaz was a colonel of a Zeon flotilla during the One Year War. Delaz initiates  as a means to undermine the security of the Earth Federation. He dies at Cima Garahau's hands in Episode 12 after encouraging Gato to push ahead with the colony drop.

Mecha: MS-14Fs Gelgoog Marine Commander Type; AGX-04 Gerbera Tetra
Commander of a group of former Zeon marines who are called upon by Delaz to help him execute Operation Stardust. It is later revealed that Cima is working for the Earth Federation, as she felt betrayed by the Principality of Zeon when her home colony was evacuated and converted into a colony laser. Cima guns down Delaz during the final phase of Operation Stardust, but is eventually killed by Uraki when her Gerbera Tetra is impaled by the beam cannon of Uraki's GP03 Dendrobium.

Mecha: MA-06 Val-Walo
A former Zeon lieutenant who fought alongside Gato during the One Year War, ultimately losing his left arm. When Uraki is beaten up by hoodlums in Von Braun City, Kelly helps him recover his mental faculties and the two become friends as Uraki helps him repair the Val-Walo mobile armor in his warehouse. However, they are both well aware that if they meet in battle, they will have no choice but to fight each other. Upon discovering that the Cima Fleet will not take him to the Delaz Fleet due to his disability, Kelly launches the Val-Walo to challenge the Gundam GP01Fb to a battle to prove them wrong. He is defeated by Uraki and dies in the explosion, as he never installed an escape system in the mobile armor.

Anaheim Electronics

An Anaheim Electronics Director based in Von Braun. Despite supporting the Federation, he secretly makes deals with Cima Garahau to supply her fleet with resources such as the Gerbera Tetra prototype mobile suit. In the aftermath of Operation Stardust, O'Sullivan commits suicide in his office.

An Anaheim Electronics systems engineer in charge of the GP03 Dendrobium at La Vie en Rose. Lucette shows high interest in assigning the GP03 Dendrobium to Uraki, despite Nina's objections. She is killed by Nakahha Nakato while helping Uraki board the Gundam prototype.

An Anaheim Electronics employee stationed aboard the Albion who is revealed to be a Zeon spy. Orville escapes from the Albion and attempts to make contact with the Kimbareid forces in Africa, but is shot down to prevent the Albion from discovering the location of the secret Zeon base.

Others

Kelly Layzner's girlfriend, who is completely against him returning to battle.

Mecha

Earth Federation

The first unit of the Gundam Development Project by the Earth Federation and Anaheim Electronics. The Gundam GP01 is a redesign of the RX-78-2 Gundam, with a 30% increase in performance over its predecessor. While it excels heavily in ground combat, it is not suitable for space battles; this is evident when Ensign Kou Uraki recklessly launches it in space and the unit is heavily damaged by Cima Garahau's Gelgoog Marine.

An upgraded version of the Gundam GP01, specifically for space use. The Gundam GP01Fb is equipped with giant thrusters on its backpack and numerous verniers on its shoulders and legs for increased maneuverability. It duels with the Gundam GP02A following the destruction of the Federation naval review until both units destroy each other. In the English dub, its name was often rendered as "Full Vernian".

The third unit of the Gundam Development Project, the GP03 Dendrobium is a massive mobile armor designed to destroy enemy fleets. It is armed with multiple missile pods, a large beam cannon, and two giant beam sabers. In addition, it is equipped with an I-field, which shields it against beam attacks. During the final phase of Operation Stardust, the GP03 Dendrobium is heavily damaged, but the Gundam GP03S Stamen remains intact; it is last seen shooting at Bask Om's fleet.

An upgraded version of the Federation's mass production mobile suit. While it boasts superior maneuverability, production costs limit the GM Custom to elite pilots. Furthermore, it excels at nothing other than being a well-balanced general purpose mobile suit. During a duel with Bernard Monsha's GM Custom, Uraki comments on it as "remarkable for being unremarkable".

A medium-range attack mobile suit that is a successor to the RX-77 Guncannon and RGC-80 GM Cannon. Unlike its predecessor, the GM Cannon II is armed with shoulder mounted beam cannons instead of units that fire solid shells. It is also equipped with Chobham armour, which protects it from heavy attacks at the cost of maneuverability.

A late production variant of the RGM-79 GM. Several units are stationed in Torrington Base in Australia, as well as various fleets in space.

A modified GM Type C equipped with a new backpack and shock absorbers on its legs, intended to serve as a testbed unit for the Gundam Development Project. The backpack emits a significantly higher output than standard backpacks, enabling the Powered GM to easily outmaneuver most Federation and Zeon mobile suits. During the pursuit outside Torrington Base, the Powered GM is destroyed by a Dom Tropen's bazooka shot at close range.

A redesign of the GM Custom for use by the Titans. It is briefly seen toward the end of episode 13.

The Earth Federation's newest Pegasus-class mobile suit carrier, named after the old name of the island of Great Britain. It is sent from Anaheim Electronics' headquarters on the moon to deliver the Gundam units GP01 and GP02A to Torrington Base. After the Gundam GP02A is stolen, the Albion is assigned to track down and recover the unit from the Delaz Fleet.

The newly constructed flagship of the Earth Federation space fleets, the Birmingham is a space battleship with a heavy emphasis on firepower, featuring a large number of beam cannons and no mobile suit hangars. It was destroyed by the GP02A's nuclear attack, but its design would form the basis for the future Dogosse Giar-class.

Principality of Zeon

The second unit of the Gundam Development Project. The Gundam GP02A is equipped with heavy shielding and an atomic bazooka that is capable of firing a nuclear warhead. Upon its arrival in Torrington Base, the Gundam GP02A is stolen by Anavel Gato, who later uses it to fire the warhead on the Federation's naval review on Konpei Island. Following this incident, it duels with the Gundam GP01Fb until both units are destroyed.

A prototype mobile armor given to Gato by the Axis Zeon forces for the second phase of Operation Stardust. The Neue Ziel is armed with multiple particle beam cannons and missiles, as well as an I-field. It is also equipped with multiple verniers for high mobility and computer-controlled sub-arms that allow non-Newtypes to execute all-range attacks. After inflicting heavy damage on Federation fleets, the Neue Ziel is destroyed when Gato and the remaining Delaz Fleet mobile units do a kamikaze run on the surrounding Federation forces.

Gato's original mobile suit during the One Year War. It was painted blue and green.

Gato's second mobile suit during the One Year War, the Prototype Rick Dom Zwei is briefly seen in the flashback introduction in episode 1 when Delaz stops him from boarding the mobile suit. It is also featured in the 2016 animated short Mayfly of Space 2.

A later variant of the MS-06 Zaku II. Several units are in service with the Delaz Fleet while some units have been captured by the Earth Federation and used for aggressor combat.

A later variant of the MS-09 Dom.

Cima Garahau's custom Gelgoog Marine unit, equipped with additional verniers and a large beam rifle.

A prototype mobile suit donated to the Cima Fleet by Anaheim Electronics. It was originally the unfinished  before Anaheim cancelled the project, but the Zeon-influenced engineers behind the project secretly completed it with a different design that is closer to Zeon mobile suits. After attacking the GP03 Dendrobium, the Gerbera Tetra is impaled by its beam cannon.

A variant of the MS-14 Gelgoog originally assigned to Zeon marine units. Following the One Year War, some units are used by the Federation for aggressor combat.

A Zeon mobile armor piloted by Kelly Layzner. The Val-Walo is equipped with beam cannons, claw arms, and Plasma Leaders that trap enemy units by jamming their electronics. In addition, it is modified to allow Kelly to pilot it with only one arm. The Val-Walo is defeated by the Gundam GP01Fb outside Von Braun.

A massive prototype mobile suit designed for long-range artillery combat. The Xamel inflicts major damage on Torrington Base, but is later on defeated by South Burning's GM Type C.

A space type assault mobile suit constructed by the Delaz Fleet using parts from the MS-06F-2 Zaku II F2 and the Gattle fighter bomber.

A Gwazine-class space battleship and the flagship of the Delaz Fleet. The Gwaden is destroyed by Cima after she assassinates Delaz.

A Musai-class Late Production Type light cruiser assigned to Gato, the Peer Gynt is named after the Norwegian play. It is sliced in half by the GP03 Dendrobium's beam saber during the final phase of Operation Stardust.

A Zanzibar-class mobile suit carrier and the flagship of the Cima Fleet, the Lili Marleen is named after the 1915 poem. It is destroyed by the GP03 Dendrobium's beam cannon during the final phase of Operation Stardust.

Media

Anime
From episodes 1-7, the opening theme is "The Winner" by Miki Matsubara while the ending theme is "Magic" by Jacob Wheeler. From episodes 8-13, the opening theme is "Men of Destiny" by MIO while the ending theme is "Evergreen" by MIO. For episodes 1 & 6, "Back to Paradise" by Miki Matsubara was used as a insert song.

{{Episode table
|background=#A9B2C3
|overall=
|title=
|airdate=
|altdate=
|altdateT=English air date
|episodes=

{{Episode list
| EpisodeNumber       = 12
| Title               = Assault on the Point of No Return
| TranslitTitle       = Kyōshū, Soshi Genkaiten
| NativeTitle         = 強襲、阻止限界点
| NativeTitleLangCode = ja
| OriginalAirDate     = 
| AltDate             = May 11, 2002
| ShortSummary        = Kou and Gato, now in their mobile armors, finally take each other on as the Albion crew tries to stop the colony before it passes the minimum limit for terminal entry. Cima's crew takes Delaz hostage aboard his flagship, the Gwaden. At Jaburo, General Kowen desperately tries to convince EFSF supreme commander Gen Gene Collini of mobilizing the military's full might to stop the colony, but Jamitov Hymem has Kowen taken away. Delaz discovers that the Federation has deployed the Solar System II mirror array past the terminal entry point and encourages Gato to see the operation through - before Cima kills him. Out of rage, Gato drives one of the Neue Ziels claws at the Gwaden bridge.
| LineColor           = A9B2C3
}}

}}

Compilation film
Just before the completion of the Mobile Suit Gundam 0083: Stardust Memory OVA in September 1992, the series was reformatted into a compilation film which was released under the title Mobile Suit Gundam 0083: The Last Blitz of Zeon (ジオンの残光 Jion no Zankō), which opened in Japanese theaters on August 29, 1992. The ending theme is "True Shining" by Rumiko Wada. "Mon Etoil" by Rumiko Wada was used as a insert song.

Home media
A special VHS sneak peek of the first episode titled GxG Unit was given to advance ticket purchasers of Mobile Suit Gundam F91.

The series was reissued in DVD format in Japan on four volumes; the first R2 disc went on sale on January 25, 2000.

In 2006, a "5.1 ch DVD Box" was released in Japan. Along with remastered footage, this release featured a brand new audio track featuring completely re-recorded dialogue, altered sound effects and music and a new surround sound experience.

Bandai Entertainment licensed the series for the US market. The series was released on VHS in dubbed and subtitled versions in 1999 to coincide with the Gundam Big Bang Project. It spanned 7 VHS volumes and was also available in a box set. Volume 1 of the R1 DVD went on sale in January 2002. Cartoon Network premiered the series on U.S. television a month later on its Adult Swim Action block, where it remained until November 2002. Due to the closure of Bandai Entertainment, the OVAs have been out-of-print. On October 11, 2014 at their 2014 New York Comic-Con panel, Sunrise announced they will be releasing all of the Gundam franchise, including Stardust Memory in North America through distribution via Right Stuf Inc., beginning in Spring 2015.

The compilation film was released on DVD in the UK, Ireland and throughout Europe by Beez Entertainment on 15 May 2006 under the title The Afterglow of Zeon'''. It was only in Japanese, but with a variety of subtitles, including English. It was released in North America in 2017.

Bandai Visual released a DVD boxed set in Japan on May 27, 2011, as part of the series' 20th anniversary.

The series later received a Blu-ray Box in Japan in 2016. This release contained both the original stereo 2.0 audio and the 2006 5.1 re-recording. It also included a two part picture drama entitled "Mayfly of Space" focusing on Cima Garahau and the Zeonic soldiers.

A Blu-Ray/DVD set based on this release was put out by Rightstuf on April 4 2017, including both English and Japanese options, though the Japanese selections are only based on the 2006 "5.1 ch" re-recording.

Models
With the release of the original series in 1991, Bandai produced 1/144 scale model kits of the GP01 and GP01Fb, GP02A, GP03S, and AGX-04 Gerbera Tetra. All five units were later released in the 1/144 scale High Grade Universal Century (HGUC) line, which included a special version of the Gundam GP02A with an MLRS launcher and a Linkin Park edition of the Gundam GP01Fb. The GP03 Dendrobium was also released in 1/144 scale and in 1/550 scale alongside the Val-Walo and the Neue Ziel. At least six mobile suits from the series have been released either under Bandai's Master Grade (MG) line. 

The GP01 and GP01Fb were released as part of the Perfect Grade (PG) line in 2003 and the Real Grade (RG) line in 2013 while the original version of the AGX-04 Gerbera Tetra, the Gundam GP04G Gerbera, was released in 2015 under the Reborn One-Hundred (RE/100) line.

Radio dramaGundam 0083's canon includes two radio dramas on CD format billed as Cinema CDs. Both drama CDs were directed by series director Takashi with dialogue by  Asahide Ōkuma (writer for 5 of the 0083 episodes).
 
 Runga Offing narrates events between Episodes 7 and 8, when the Albion engages a Chivvay-class Zeon warship. It introduces a new character named Aristide Hughes, the Albions Gunnery Lieutenant.
 
 Mayfly of Space reveals Cima's backstory in flashbacks as she reflects on her past prior to the events of Episode 13. It reveals that Cima and her Marine Amphibious Unit (MAU) poisoned a Side 5 colony using G-3 nerve gas under orders, but were treated as pariahs afterwards by their own countrymen for committing such an atrocity. At the end of the war, her superior refused to let her retreat to Axis. Because their home colony Mahal had been converted into a weapon, Cima and her men were left stranded and homeless.

Both of these stories appear in the PlayStation 2 game Mobile Suit Gundam: Encounters in Space. Portions of Mayfly of Space were adapted into two animated short features; the first in 1993 and the second in 2016.

Print
Kadokawa Shoten released a three-part novelization of the series. Penned by Hiroshi Yamaguchi, the books contain illustrations by Toshihiro Kawamoto, Hirotoshi Sano, and Hajime Katoki. It was made available online via Book Walker on May 26, 2014.

Viz Communications also released all episodes in a comic book format from 1994 to 1995. However, instead of a manga, they used screenshots from each episode for the panels. Line art and descriptions of all units were inserted as well.

A manga reboot titled  began publication in Kadokawa Shoten's Gundam Ace in June 26, 2013. Volume 16 was released on February 26, 2021 and concluded the plot of the OVA with an original ending. Volume 17 starts a spinoff sequel, that is non-canon to the anime continuity, about the return of Anavel Gato who survives Operation Stardust in the manga. The manga is written by the OVA's director Takashi Imanishi and illustrated by Masato Natsumoto.

Reception

References

Bibliography
 Gundam 0083 Stardust Memory''.  Gundam Film Book Series 5. .

External links
 Official Website: Anime
 
 

1991 anime OVAs
1992 anime OVAs
1992 anime films
Bandai Entertainment anime titles
Dengeki Comics
0083
Sunrise (company)
Films about nuclear war and weapons